The 2016 Women's Australian Hockey League was the 24th edition of the women's field hockey tournament. The tournament was held in the Western Australia city of Perth.

Queensland Scorchers won the gold medal for the sixth time by defeating the Victorian Vipers 3–2 in the final. NSW Arrows won the bronze medal by defeating Canberra Strikers 2–1 in the third place playoff.

Competition format
The tournament is divided into two pools, Pool A and Pool B, each consisting of five teams in a round robin format. Throughout the pool stage however, teams from each pool competed in crossover matches with the teams in the other pool, with each team playing one crossover match.

At the conclusion of the pool stage, the top two teams of Pools A and B progressed through to the semi-finals, where the top placed teams of each pool competed against the second placed team of each pool, with the winners progressing to the final.

The bottom three teams in each pool move into Pool C (Classification Round), where teams carry over points from previous matches, and play the remaining teams. The final placings in Pool C carry over to final placings in the tournament.

Teams
Domestic Teams

  Canberra Strikers
  New South Wales Arrows
  NT Pearls
  Queensland Scorchers
  SA Suns
  Tassie Van Demons
  Victorian Vipers
  WA Diamonds

International Teams
  Malaysia Tigress
  New Zealand Futures

Results

First round

 Note: All dates and times of crossover matches have been bolded and points have been added to teams' respective pools.

Pool A

Pool B

Second round

Pool C (Classification round)

First to fourth place classification

Semi-finals

Third and fourth place

Final

Awards

Statistics

Final standings

References

2016
2016 in New Zealand women's sport
2016 in Malaysian women's sport
International women's field hockey competitions hosted by Australia
2016 in Australian women's field hockey